Dmytro Bezperchy (Ukrainian:Дмитро Іванович Безперчий; 30 October 1825, Borisovka — 30 September 1913, Kharkiv) was a Russian genre painter in the Academic style.

Early life 
He studied art in Saint Petersburg, from 1841 to 1846, at the Imperial Academy of Arts, and was employed in the workshops of Karl Bryullov after 1843. There, he met the poet, Taras Shevchenko, who had a strong influence on his thematic choices. Upon graduating, he was named a ""

Career 
Initially known for his watercolors, he also created numerous oil paintings, some graphic works depicting the Haydamak (paramilitary fighters), and illustrations for Dead Souls by Nikolai Gogol. From the 1860s to the 1890s, he also engaged in religious work, decorating churches in Sloboda Ukraine and Crimea.

As a drawing teacher, he worked at the Nizhyn Lyceum, the Kharkiv gymnasium and the Realschule. Many of the best known names in Ukrainian, Russian and Polish art studied with him, including Henryk Siemiradzki, Serhii Vasylkivsky, Vladimir Aleksandrovich Beklemishev, Oleksandr Shevchenko, Konstantin Pervukhin,  and Vladimir Tatlin.

Legacy 

See also 

 List of Ukrainian painters

Sources 
 Ukrainian Soviet Encyclopedia. In 12 volumes / Ed. M. Bazhana, URE edition, 1974—1985.
 D. P. Gordeev, "Materials for the artistic chronicle of Kharkov", 1914.
 Shevchenko's Dictionary: in 2 volumes, Institute of Literature. Taras Shevchenko Academy of Sciences of the USSR. - Kyiv: Main edition of URE, 1978

External links

 A. Antonovich, Dmytro Bezperchy (Masters of Ukrainian Art Series), Ukrainian Youth Publishing House, 1926 Online
 M. F. Sumtsov, "Д. И. БЕЗПЕРЧИЙ: Харьковский художник: Некролог" (obituary) Online
 Brief biography @ the Encyclopedia of Modern Ukraine

1825 births
1913 deaths
Ukrainian painters
Ukrainian genre painters
Imperial Academy of Arts alumni
Ukrainian illustrators
People from Belgorod Oblast